Chamoli district is a district of the Uttarakhand state of India. It is bounded by the Tibet region to the north, and by the Uttarakhand districts of Pithoragarh and Bageshwar to the east, Almora to the south, Pauri Garhwal to the southwest, Rudraprayag to the west, and Uttarkashi to the northwest. The administrative headquarters of Chamoli district is in Gopeshwar.

Chamoli hosts a variety of destinations of pilgrim and tourist interest including Badrinath, Hemkund Sahib and Valley of Flowers. Chipko movement was first started in Chamoli.

Etymology
The word "Chamoli" is Sanskrit Language word is "Chandramoli" (Chandra (Moon) + Moli (Wears Moon on Head) Which meaning is the Hindu god Shiva.

History

The region covered by the district of Chamoli formed part of the Pauri Garhwal district till 1960. It occupies the northeastern corner of the Garhwal tract and lies in the central or mid-Himalayas in the very heart of the snowy range described in ancient books as Bahirgiri, one of the three divisions of the Himalayan mountains.

Chamoli, the district of "Garhwal" the land of forts. Today's Garhwal was known as Kedar-khand in the past. In puranas Kedar-khand was said to be abode of Hindu God. It seems from the facts  vedas puranas, Ramayna and Mahabharat that these Hindu scriptures are scripted in kedar-khand. It is believed that Hindu God Ganesha first script of vedas in Vayas gufa situated in the last village Mana only  from Badrinath.

According to Rigveda (1017–19) after Inundation (Jalprlya) Sapt-Rishis saved their lives in the same village Mana. Besides there the roots of vedic literature seems  to be originated from Garhwal because the Garhwali language has a lot of words common with Sanskrit. According to Aadi-Puran, vedvyasa scripted the story of Mahabhrat in Vyas Gufa near Badrinath. In Kedar-khand Puran this land is regarded the land of lord Shiva.

The authentic script about the history of Garhwal is found only 6th AD onward. Some of the oldest examples of these are the trishul in Gopeshwar, lalitsur in Pandukeshwar. The Narvaman rock script in siroli the chand pur Gari rock script by king Kankpal authenticates the history and culture of Garhwal.

It is believed that about 300 BC, Khasa invaded Garhwal through Kashmir Nepal and Kuman. A conflict grew due to this invasion a conflict took place between these outsiders and natives. The natives for their protection built small forts called Garhi. Later on, Khasa defeated the native totally and captured the forts.

Khasa confined Garhwal of hundreds of Garhi in to fifty-two Garhi only. One vashudev general of khasas established his regime on the northern border of garhwal and founded his capital in joshimath then Kartikeypur. Vashudev katyuri was the founder of katyura dynasty in Garhwal and they reign Garhwal over hundreds of years in this period of katyuri regime Aadi Sankaracharya visited Garhwal and established Jyotrimath (now in Chamoli) which is one of the four Mathas established by Aadi Sankaracharya. In Bharat varsh other these are Dwarika, Puri and Sringeri. He also reinstated idol of Lord Badrinath in Badrinath(town), before this the idol of Badrinath was hidden in Narad-Kund by the fear of Budhas. After this ethicist of vaidic cult started to pilgrim Badrinath.

According to Pt. Harikrishna Raturi, King Bhanu Pratap was the first ruler of Panwar dynasty in Garhwal who founded Chanpur-Garhi as his capital. This was the strongest  (fort) of the fifty-two in of garhwal.

The devastating earthquake of 8 September 1803 weakened the economic and administrative set-up of Garhwal state. Taking advantage of the situation, Gorkhas attacked Garhwal under the command of Amar Singh Thapa and Hastidal Chanturia. They established there, reign over half of the Garhwal in 1804 up to 1815 this region remain under Gorkha rule.

Meanwhile, the king of Panwar dynasty Raja Sudarshan Shah contacted east India Company and sought help. With the help of British he defected Gorkas and merged the eastern part of Alaknanda and Mandakini along with the capital srinagar in British Garhwal from that time this region was known as British Garhwal and the capital of Garhwal was set up at Tehri instead of Srinagar. In the beginning British ruler kept this area under Dehradun and Saharanpur. But later on the British established a new district in this area and named it Pauri. Today's chamoli was a tehsil of the same. On 24 February 1960, tehsil Chamoli was upgraded to a new district. In October 1997, two complete tehsil and two other blocks (partially) of district chamoli were merged into a new formed district Rudraprayag.

Geography

Chamoli, carved as a separate revenue district in 1960 out of the erstwhile Garhwal district, lies in the Central Himalaya and constitutes a part of the celebrated 'Kedar Kshetra'. Chamoli District is surrounded by Uttarkashi in the northwest, Pithoragarh in the east, Bageshwar in the southeast, Almora in the west, Pauri Garhwal in the southwest and Rudraprayag in the west.

Geology
The geology of the region shows that the Himalayas are amongst the youngest mountains in the world. During early Mesozoic times the land mass now covered by them was occupied by the great Tethys sea. The probable date of the commencement of the elevation of the Himalayas is about the close of the Mesozoic era, but the unraveling of the story of their structure has only just begun, and in many cases no dating of the rocks is yet possible, though they include ancient and relatively recent crystalline intrusive, rocks and sediments allied to the peninsular part of India. The section of the range in the district is deeply cut into by the headwaters of the Allaknanda river, this trunk stream seeming to have reached a latter stage of development than its tributaries. This much, however, is known that there has been intense metamorphism. In some parts uplift has been considerable since the mid-Pleistocene epoch, in others there are great stretches of high but subdued topography and elsewhere there are the deepest gorges. The direction of folding in these mountain masses is generally North to South. The geological feature of the district form two major divisions which lies North and south of an imaginary line extending east-southeast between the villages of Hilang in Joshimath and Loharkhet in the adjoining District of Pithoragarh. The Northern division, which is occupied by higher ranges and snow-covered peaks consist entirely of medium to high grade metamorphic rocks and is intruded by later volcanic rocks. The division to the South, occupied by ranges of lower altitude, consists essentially of sedimentary and low grade metamorphic rock also intruded by later volcanic rocks. Geologically very little is known of the first division which consists of rocks such as quartzites, marbles and various types of micaceous schists and gneisses which a few sporadic occurrences of garnet, graphite, iron, kyanite, mica and vein quartz. The division to the south of the imaginary line is better known geologically and consists of rocks such as gneisses, limestone, phyllites, quartzite, sericite-biotite schists and slates.

Minerals
The minerals that are found in the district are the following:

Asbestos – This is of the amosite variety and can be used for the production of asbestos, cement bricks, laboratory asbestos sheet and paper, but is not considered to be of economic importance.

Magnestic – This is of an average quality is crystalline in nature, and is found associated with crystalline dolomites and sometimes with soapstone. The Magnesium carbonate found here is also of average quality and its mineralisation has also been reported to occur in the district.

Soapstone (or steatite) – This white saponaceous stone resembling pipe clay is obtained in as lenticular body and is associated with mineral pyrites, which adds a colour to it, and in places with magnesite. it can be mined for use as filler in soap and in the cosmetic industries. In the past various utensils were made of it which, when polished, had the appearance of marble.

Copper – The copper mines in the district are extensive and of reputed during the period of Hindus and The Gorkhas rules. All the rich mines have since being exhausted and at present they do not offer a fair field for the employment of capital.

Iron – Small and sporadic occurrence of iron are known to occur in several parts of district but are of hardly any economic importance. Iron ore, rich in haematite, and magnetic ore, with haematite and siderite, also occur in the district.

Graphite – In the past this mineral, also known as plumbago, found mostly in patti Lohba, was used as a dye but no large deposits have been noticed for a long time.

Gold – Although no gold mines has been discovered in the district, the sands of Alaknanda and the Pinddar are said to be auriferous to a limited extent.

Gypsum – This mineral is found on the bank of some river and was used in the past for the manufacture of saucers and bowls. when ground to a fine powder it is known as Plaster of Paris and can be used for a number of purposes.

Lead – Deposits of this metal were fairly numerous in the past but it is found in somewhat inaccessible places and has long since ceased to be worked.

Slate – This dense, fine grained metamorphic rock, which is produced from a fine clay, can be split into thin, smooth plates and is quarried throughout the district. It is suitable for roofing purposes, the thin dark blue slates being somewhat inferior in quality.

Limestone – By burning this mineral, lime is procured which can be used as mortar. There are two distinct ranges of limestone hills in the district, the first, north of the Alaknanda in Nagpur, the second, running from Lohba patti to the Pinddar and again to the Alaknanda in patti Bacchansyun in district Garhwal. Reserves of dolomite exists in the district and tufaceous deposits are also found near several Nullahs.

Building stone – Stone which can be used for building purposes is available in most parts of the district. Sandstone is found in abundance in the lower hills. Gneiss and chlorite schists which are available throughout the district are frequently used for building purposes.

Sulphur – This yellow mineral, also known as brimstone is found in the district as green sulphate of iron and is obtainable from iron pyrites and copper mines, its presence being characterised by a small as of rotten eggs. Sulphur springs also occur in many parts in the district.

Bitumen – The brownish white natural sulphate of alumina known as Shilajit is found in rocks at a fairly high altitude and occur in small lumps which generally have an admixture of red sand and micaceous stone embedded in them. It is used in Ayurvedic medicine and during the season when there is an influx of pilgrims, it fetches good income to those who deal in it.

Some other minerals found in the district are antimony, arsenic, lignite or brown marble, mica and silver.

Physiographically the district, which lies in a region of tectonic or folded and overthrust mountain chains, has strata are structurally marked by complex folds, reverse faults, overthrusts and nappes of great dimensions, all these as well as frequent earthquake of varying intensity give region to believe that the region is still unstable. Although any movement or tremor of the Earth's crust in the district is not produced by volcanic activity, the Chaukhamba peak a pair to be the crater of an extinct volcano.

Climate
As the elevation of the district ranges from 800 m to 8,000 m above sea level the climate of the district vary largely depending on the altitude. The winter season is from about mid November to March. As most of the region is situated on the southern slopes of the outer Himalayas, monsoon currents can enter through the valley, the rainfall being heaviest in the monsoon from June to September.

Rainfall – Most of the rainfall occur during the period June to September when 70 to 80 percent of the annual precipitation is accounted for in the southern half of the district and 55 to 65 percent in the northern half. The effectiveness of the rains is, among others, related to low temperature which means less evapotranspiration and forest or vegetation cover. However, the effectiveness is neither uniform nor even positive in areas where either the vegetational cover is poor and/or has steep slopes or the soils have been so denuded that their moisture absorption capacity has become marginal.

Rain gauging stations put up at seven locations by Meteorological department of Govt. of India, represent the settled land mass of Chamoli district.

Temperature – The details of temperature recorded at the meteorological observatories in the district show that the highest temperature was 34 °C and lowest 0 °C. January is the coldest month after which the temperature begin to rise till June or July. temperature vary with elevation. During the winter cold waves in the wake of western disturbances may cause temperature to fall appreciably. Snow accumulation in valleys is considerable.

Humidity – The relative humidity is high during monsoon season, generally exceeding 70% on the average. The driest part of the year is the pre monsoon period when the humidity may drop to 35% during the afternoon. During the winter months humidity increases toward the afternoon at certain high stations.

Cloudiness – Skies are heavily clouded during the monsoon months and for short spells when the region is affected by the passage of western disturbances. During the rest of the year the skies are generally clear to lightly clouded.

Winds – Owing to the nature of terrain local affect are pronounced and when the general prevailing winds not too strong to mask these effect, there is a tendency for diurnal reversal of winds, the flow being anabatic during the day and katabatic at night, the latter being of considerable force.

River system
Chamoli district is crisscrossed by several important rivers and their tributaries. Alaknanda, traversing a distance of 229 km. before it confluence with Bhagirathi at Devprayag and constituting the Ganges, is the major river.

The Alaknanda originates at a height of 3641 meters below Balakun peak 16 km. upstream from Badrinath form the two glaciers of Bhagirath Kharak and Satopanth. The two glaciers rise from the eastern slopes of Chaukhamba (7140 meters) peak, Badrinath peak and its satellite peaks. These peaks separates the Gangotri group of glaciers in the west. The major portion of the Alaknanda basin falls in Chamoli district. From its source up to Hallang (58 km), the valley is treated as upper Alaknanda valley. The remaining part of the area is known as lower Alanknanda valley. While moving from its source, the river flows in a narrow deep gorge between the mountain slopes of Alkapuri, from which it drives its name. All along its course, it drains its tributaries:

Saraswati joins the Alaknanda 9 km downstream from Mana.

Khir Ganga joins it below the Badrinath shrine and Bhyundar Ganga originated from Tipra glacier and Hemkund Sahib joins Alaknanda River at Govindghat after merging with River Pushpawati at Ghangaria.

Dhauliganga meets at Vishnuprayag above Joshimath. The river Dhauliganga rises from the Nitti Pass at about 5070 meters. Its valley lies between the Kamet groups of peaks in the west and Nandadevi group in the east. The Dhauli takes a northern course at Malari. Between Malari and Tapovan, it is almost a narrow gorge with perpendicular cliffs on either side. several thousand meters high. the Dhauliganga in its turn is fed by GirthiGanga at Kurkuti and Rishiganga 500 metres below Reni.

Downstream small tributaries – Helang, Garud, Patal and Birahiganga join the Alaknanda between Joshimath and Chamoli.

Nandakini, which rises from Semudra Glaciers drainage the western slopes of Trishul mountains, joins it at Nandprayag.

Southeast, river Pindar joins the Alaknanda at Karnprayag. The Pindar river is fed by the Milam and Pindar glacier from the Nandadevi group of glacier. The Pindar river, before joining Alaknanda, is fed by Kaliganga and Bheriganga.

The rivers of Chamoli district, generally flow with great force in steep and narrow channels often resulting in excessive erosion and collapse of the banks.

Nanda Devi glacier flood 

On 7 February 2021 a part of Nanda Devi, a Himalayan glacier, broke away at Joshimath. This caused water levels in the Rishiganga and Dhauliganga rivers to rise. One dam at the Rishiganga Hydroelectric Project was destroyed and another, the Dhauliganga Hydropower Project at Reni village, suffered a partial collapse. Initial reports said eleven people were dead and 170 missing. Water levels on the Alaknanda also rose. Five bridges were destroyed, and flood alerts were issued for Pauri, Tehri, Rudraprayag, Haridwar, and Dehradun regions. In order to reduce rising water levels on the Alaknanda, the flow of the Bhagirathi River was stopped.

Assembly Constituencies
Badrinath 
Tharali (SC) 
Karnprayag

Demographics 

In 2022 Chamoli district has a population of 691,605, roughly equal to the nation of Maldives. This gives it a ranking of 559th in India (out of a total of 640). Its population growth rate over the decade 2001–2011 was 5.6%. Chamoli has a sex ratio of 1021 females for every 1000 males, and a literacy rate of 83.48%. Scheduled Castes and Scheduled Tribes make up 20.25% and 3.13% of the population respectively.

The major predominant first language of the district is Garhwali, which according to the 2011 census was spoken by 90% of the population. Hindi, though widely used a lingua franca, is the first language of 5.1%, while smaller communities include speakers of Bhotia (1.6%), Nepali (1.4%), Kumaoni (1%) and Rongpo

40).).

Culture, fair and festival

Housing
The houses in the district have not been built according to any town planning scheme but have been put up haphazardly in clusters on level ground at places where water springs are accessible or on the bank of the river in the valley. The houses are built of stones and are generally double-storeyed, a few having three to five storeys, the very low rooms on the ground floor, which are usually 1.8 metres high, being used for housing the cattle. Each house has in front of it a courtyard called a Chauk. A mud or stone staircase or a wooden ladder leads to the upper storey, the roof being of wood. The height of the upper storey is generally 2.1 metres and the roof is usually a sloping structures of timber covered with Patals (quartzite slabs), the well off use corrugated galvanised iron sheets. Generally the upper storey has a veranda in front of the upper rooms.

The houses in the higher regions are two to three storeys with balconies all round and paved courtyard in front where people do their threshing, weaving, spinning and other house hold works. A few houses have five or six storeys, the topmost being used as the kitchen. At times the cattle sheds are made at some distance from the villages. The houses are built in rows of half a dozen or so and strikingly picturesque in their fort like appearance.

Food
The staple grains consumed by the people of the district are wheat, rice, maze, mandua and jhanjora, the last three being coarse grains generally eaten by the poorer sections. The pulses consumed are urad, gahat, bhatt, soontha, tur, lopia and masor. The Hindus of the district mostly vegetarian by habit and preference and although the Muslims, Christians and Sikhs are generally non-vegetarian, those not able to afford eating meat daily due to want of fund or local unavailability often resulting to a vegetarian diet.

Jewellery
Bichhuwas (toe-rings of silver) are worn by married women whose husband are alive. Keels (small studs) worn on the left nostril, nose ring (Naths) and ear rings made of gold and hansulis (ornament worn round the neck), chandanhar (necklaces) and necklaces consisting of coloured beads or rupees or of the teeth and claws of the Panther are generally worn by women and girls. Silver amulets set with turquoise are also worn round the neck and arms. Married women wear anklets made of copper or silver. Churis (Bangles) of gold, silver or of coloured glass are usually worn by women and girls. Bhotiya women wear this type of jewellery and articles made of ivory are also worn at times. Men usually wear rings and some wear gold chain round their neck.

Dress
The dress of the people of the district is simple, economical and well suited for the hill environment. The usual dress for men is a Kurta (long lose shirt) or shirt, Pyjama (tight from the knee down), Sadri (jacket), a cap and a knee-length coat, the last named being worn in winter. Those better off are increasingly taking to trousers and buttoned up coats. Women often wear the Sari and full sleeved shirt or Angra (a sort of jacket) in place of a shirt, the well to do wearing woolen jacket in winter. In the rural areas most of the women still wear the long full shirt, tight fitting long sleeved jacket and an Orhni (long scarf for covering the head and shoulders).

Female students often wear the Salwar (very full pyjama narrow at the ankle), Kamiz (knee length shirt) and Dupatta ( long scarf for the head and shoulders). The Bhotiyas who live at high altitudes generally wear woollen clothes. The usual wear for the men are pyjamas, shirt, coat and cap. The women wear grey-coloured Angras, a Ghagra (long full shirt), phantu (coloured scarf) and a woollen shawl which is worn so as to make a pocket on each side. Both men and women wear a long piece of cotton cloth as a tight Kamarband (a sort of belt).

Recreation
Living in the mountains mostly in places that are not easily accessible, the people of the district have been able to preserve their culture, folklore, folksongs and folk dances, the last, a distinctive feature of the district, being seasonal, traditional and religious, some of the better known being described below.

The Thadiya dance, which is accompanied by song, is performed on Basant Panchami, the festival celebrating the advent of Spring, the Mela, another dance, is perform on Deepawali and the Pandava during the winter after the harvesting of the crop and depicts the principal events of the Mahabharata. Other folk dances are Jeetu Bhagdawal and Jagar or Ghariyali. These dances enact mythological stories, the participants, both men and women, put on their traditional colourful dress and dance to the tune of drums and Ransinghas. Another dance performed during the fairs and accompanied by song is the Chanchari, in which both men and women participate.

Folk songs are usually traditional and are sung particularly by the women, who work very hard in the fields from morning till night in all kind of weather. During the month Chaitra the women of the village gather at a central place and sing traditional song which generally relate deeds of heroism, love and the hard life which they have to lead in the hills. In the district, fairs, festivals, religious and social gatherings are the main occasions for recreation and amusement. On special occasions people arrange Swangs (open air dramatic performances) particularly depicting scenes or legends connected with Shiva and Parvati.

Fairs And festivals
Festivals play an important role in the life of people in the district, as elsewhere, and are spread over the entire year, the most important being briefly described below.

Ram Navami falls on the ninth day of the bright half of Chaitra to celebrate the birthday of Rama. The followers of Rama in the district observe fast throughout the day and the Ramayana is read and recited and people gather to listen to the recitations.

Nag Panchmi is celebrated in the district on the fifth day of the bright half of Sravana to appease the Nagas or serpent gods. Figures of snakes are drawn in flour in wooden boards and are worshipped by the family by offering milk, flowers and rice.

Raksha-Bandhan is traditionally associated with the Brahmanas and falls on the last day of Sravana. On this occasion a sister ties a Rakshasutra (thread of protection)—commonly known as Rakhi—round the right wrist of her brother in token of the protection she expects to receive from him. Fairs are held on this occasion at Kedarnath, Karnaprayag and Nandprayag.

Janmastami – the festival celebrating the birth of Krishna, falls on the eighth day of the dark half of Bhadra. As in other parts of the state, devotees in the district fast the whole day, breaking their fast only at mid-night when worshipers throng the temples and foregather to have a Jhanki (glimpse) of the shrines and cradles specially installed, decorated and illuminated in homes and other places to commemorate the deity's birth. A special feature of this festival is the singing of devotional songs in praise of Krishna in shrines and homes. The Chhati (sixth-day ceremony after birth) is also celebrated by the devout. The festival is celebrated with great enthusiasm at Nagnath, Badrinath and Kedarnath.

Dusshera – falls on the tenth day of the bright half of Asvina and commemorates the victory of Rama over Ravana, the preceding nine days being celebrated as Navaratri dedicated to the worship of the goddess Durga. Ramlila celebrations are held at different places in the district particularly at Kalimath.

Dipawali – the festival of lights, is celebrated in the district, as elsewhere, on the last day of the dark half of Kartika when the houses are illuminated and the goddess Lakshmi is worshipped. Festivities start two days earlier, with Dhanteras, when metal utensils are purchased as a token of the desired prosperity, followed by Naraka Chaturdashi when a few small earthen lamps are lit as a preliminary to the main day of festival. For traders and businessmen Dipawali marks the end of the fiscal year and they pray for prosperity in the new year. On this occasion the people of the district perform mela nritya, a type of folk dance, a distinctive feature of the district.

Makar Sankranti – a bathing festival which falls either on 13 or 14 January when people take bath in the Alaknanda and big fairs (Uttarayni) are held at Karanprayag and Nandprayag.

Shiv-ratri – falls on the 14th day of the dark half of Phalgun and is observed in the honour of Shiva. People fast throughout the day and a vigil is kept at night when the deity is worshipped. The Shiva temples are specially decorated and illuminated and large numbers of devotees offer water and flowers to the symbols and images of Shiva and sing devotional songs in his praise. Big fairs are held on this occasion at most of the Shiva temples of the district particularly at Dewal, Bairaskund, Gopeshwar, and Nagnath.

Holi – the spring festival, is celebrated on the full moon day of Phalgun. People start singing Phaags (Songs of Phalgun) during the nights, long before the festival. A flag or banner is installed at a central place in the village on the 11th day of bright of Phalgun and is burnt on the 15th day which is known as Chharoli when ash mark is put on the foreheads of friends and relatives. The following day is marked by common rejoicing when, till about noon, people throw coloured water and coloured powder on each other and in evening visit relatives and friends.

Many fairs are held in the district, the important ones being mentioned below.

On the 13th day of April every year the big fair known as Bishwat Sankranti is held in the district. This fair is also mentioned in the Pandukeshwar inscription of Lalitashuradeva issued in the 22nd regnal year. It is also held at Ming (14 April), Aser (15 April), Hans Koti (16 April), and Kulsari and Adbadri (17 April). Another important fair of the district is the Gaucher Mela held at Gaucher in Karnprayag in the month of November every year and is attended by number of persons. Others fairs of importance are the Nautha at Adbadri, Naumi at Hariyali, Nanda Devi at Bedni, Dattatreya Pooranmasi at Ansuya temple, Nagnath at Dewar Walla.

Nanda Devi Raj Jaat – Nanda Raj Jaat, the big pilgrimage of Nandadevi, is unique to Chamoli. It is very old traditional pilgrimage from the time of shalipal in the ninth century. There are no historical records but it is gathered from the local folklores and folksongs (jagori) that Shahipal who had his capital at Chandpur Garhi, buried a tantric instrument at Nauti nearby, and installed his patron-goddess Nandadevi (Raj Rajeshwari) there. The Royal priest, Nautiyal, of Nauti was made responsible for regular worship of the goddess.

King Shahipal started a tradition that a big pilgrimage (Nanda Raj Jat) would bw organised every twelfth year to escort Nandadevi to her in-law's place, near Nanda Ghungti peak. When the capital was shifted by Ajay Pal, Kunwar (the younger brother of the king), who gad settled at Kansuwa nearby, was authorised to organise Raj Jat on behalf of King.

Traditionally the Kunwar comes to Nauti to seek the blessing of the Devi to organise the Jat. A four horned ram takes birth in Kasuwa area thereafter. A time schedule is drawn up for the Jat so as to reach Homkund on the Nandashtami day in August/September, and Kulsari on the preceding new moon for special worship.

Accordingly, the Kunwar reaches Nauti with the four horned ram and ringal-umbrella. The Raj Jat starts on the long round-trek of about 280 km. with 19 halts on the way, taking about 19 days. Bhumiyal, Ufrai and Archana Devis are worshipped prior to the departure. The golden image of Nandadevi is carried in a silver palanquin and thousands of devotees follow in a long procession.

Great festivities and religious observances mark the Jaat wherever they halt or pass through. The procession swells as it advances with various groups joining from far and near with their idols and umbrellas. Special mention may be made of those coming from kurud from Ghat, Lata near Tapovan and Almora in Kumaon. Some 300 idols and decorated umbrellas assembles at Wan, en route Hemkund.

Mass participation and religious devotion are unmatched, for the Jat involves a long and arduous journey over treacherous terrains rising to an altitude of 5,335 m at Jiura Gali Dhar from a near 900 m at Nauti, walking barefoot over snow and moraines and passing through deep forests.

At Shail Samundra the pilgrims see three lights and a streak of smoke just before dawn as a divine beckon.

Surprisingly the four horned ram, loaded with the offerings for the goddess, guides the procession of devotees from the Nauti till it reaches Hemkund, near the base of Nanda Ghungti, resting every night near the Nauti umbrella of the goddess. At Hemkund it manifests human emotions and tears are seen in its eyes before it leaves everyone behind to get lost towards the mountains, laden with the offering of the devotees for the goddess Nandadevi.

There is a unique custom of keeping everyone's house unlocked in Wan village for the use of the yatris on the Jat day, according to the divine instruction of the goddess Nandadevi, and it is followed religiously. The last NandaDevi Raj Jat was held during August/September 2000. Smaller Raj Jaats are organised annually from Kurud village near Ghat, covering a smaller circuit in August–September.

Notable people 

 Gaura Devi
 Chandi Prasad Bhatt
 Kamla Pant
 Vijay Prasad Dimiri
 Totakacharya

See also
1999 Chamoli earthquake
Chamoli Gopeshwar

References

External links

 
 Chamoli District Map at indiamapatlas.com

 
Districts of Uttarakhand
Populated places established in 1960